Marc'Antonio Ziani (c. 1653 – 22 January 1715) was an Italian composer living in Vienna.

Ziani was born in Venice. He probably studied with his uncle, the organist Pietro Andrea Ziani. From 1686 to 1691 Ziani was maestro di cappella to Duke Ferdinando Carlo di Gonzaga in Mantua, but simultaneously developed his career as an opera composer in Venice. In 1700 Ziani was appointed vice Hofkapellmeister to Leopold I in Vienna, and on 1 January 1712 Charles VI promoted him to Hofkapellmeister. He was succeeded by Johann Fux. He died in Vienna.

Recordings
Alma Redemptoris Mater, in Stabat Mater: Sances, Bertali, Schmelzer. Carlos Mena & Ricercar Consort, Philippe Pierlot conductor. Mirare. 2007.

References

1650s births
1715 deaths
18th-century Italian male musicians
Italian Baroque composers
Italian male classical composers
Musicians from Venice
18th-century Italian composers